Abronia fuscolabialis, the Mount Zempoaltepec arboreal alligator lizard,  is an endangered arboreal alligator lizard described in 1944 by Joseph Tihen.

References

Abronia
Reptiles described in 1944